Lincoln Red Imps Football Club is a professional association football club from Gibraltar. They play in the Gibraltar National League, and share Victoria Stadium with all other clubs in the territory. They are the country's record champion with 24 league titles, including fourteen consecutive titles between 2003 and 2016, and in 2014 were the first team to represent Gibraltar in the UEFA Champions League's qualifying stage. In August 2021, Lincoln became the first club from Gibraltar to ever reach the group stages of a European club competition after defeating the Latvian champions Riga FC in the play-off round of the UEFA Europa Conference League.

The club holds Europe's longest chronological unbeaten league run of 88 matches over 1,959 days from May 2009 to September 2014.

History
The football club was first formed in 1976 by Charles Polson and Charles Head, the latter managing the team. A group of players associated to the old Police youth team called the "Blue Batons" and complemented by players that had been released by Glacis United and St Jago's joined forces to form the first Lincoln team that played in the Gibraltar fourth division as a youth team. The team was named after Lincoln City FC, who are nicknamed the "Imps" after the legend of the Lincoln Imp. Lincoln Red Imps received their name after they were sponsored by Reg Brealey, the former Sheffield United chairman and Lincoln resident who is friends with Charles Polson.
 

When this Lincoln team became old enough to play Senior Football, it was decided to place the young team into the GFA second division. The team started to climb to the top in the second division in the season 1981–82 winning the league, the division cup and gaining promotion to the GFA's first division after only one season. The next year Lincoln finished in mid table in the first division. In 1983–84 Lincoln won the league and promotion to the Gibraltar Premier Division.

In 1984–85 Lincoln played their first season in the Gibraltar Premier Division in which they were joint champions with Glacis United – the first of seven league titles which were won between 1984 and 1994.

Lincoln won 14 Gibraltar Premier Division titles in a row from 2003 to 2016, bettering the previous record of nine in a row held by Glacis United in the 1960s. They also won the national treble of League, Rock Cup and Senior Cup in 2004, 2005, 2006, 2007, 2008 and 2011.

2014
In 2014, after Gibraltar had joined UEFA as the 54th member, Lincoln became the first Gibraltarian team to play in the qualifying stages of the UEFA Champions League. After claiming a 1–1 draw in the home match, they lost 5–2 at Faroese team HB and were eliminated in the first qualifying round.

2015
Lincoln won both the 2015 Rock Cup with a 4–1 victory over Lynx F.C. and the 2014–15 Gibraltar Premier Division championship by 16 points, again playing in the qualification stages for the UEFA Champions League for with their second straight double. In the First Qualifying Round Lincoln were drawn against FC Santa Coloma of Andorra. After a scoreless draw in the first leg in Gibraltar, the club earned a 2–1 victory at the Estadi Comunal d'Andorra la Vella to advance to the Second Qualifying Round with goals coming from Anthony Bardon and Lee Casciaro. With the victory, Lincoln became the first club from Gibraltar to reach the second round of UEFA Champions League qualification, setting up an encounter with 2015 Danish champions FC Midtjylland, which Lincoln Red Imps lost on aggregate 0–3.

2016 
In 2016 Lincoln pulled off a surprise victory against Scottish Premiership champions Celtic, with a 1–0 victory at home after a 48th-minute strike from Lee Casciaro in the club's second round match of the UEFA Champions League qualifying stage.
The match was Brendan Rodgers first competitive fixture as manager of Celtic. The Glasgow side still comfortably qualified thanks to a 3–0 victory in the return leg at Celtic Park.

2021 
On 26 August 2021, Lincoln became the first team from Gibraltar to qualify for the group stage in a European Competition, as they defeated Riga FC by a score of 3–1 (4–2 aggregate) and advanced to the group stage of the 2021–22 UEFA Europa Conference League.

Seasons (since UEFA acceptance)

Stadium

Lincoln currently plays all league games at the 2,000-seat Victoria Stadium. The club share this ground with all clubs currently participating in the Gibraltar Premier Division, as well as the Gibraltar Women's Football League, of which Lincoln also runs a team.

Due to the ground's failure to meet guidelines in the 2017–18 season, Lincoln, along with Europa and St Joseph's, were forced to play their European competition matches at the Estadio Algarve in Portugal, while improvements were carried out on Victoria Stadium.

It is expected that the ground will be renovated and expanded to a football specific stadium with a capacity of 8,000 by 2021.

Honours

Gibraltar National League: 27
 1984–85, 1988–89, 1989–90, 1990–91, 1991–92, 1992–93, 1993–94, 2000–01, 2002–03, 2003–04, 2004–05, 2005–06, 2006–07, 2007–08, 2008–09, 2009–10, 2010–11, 2011–12, 2012–13, 2013–14, 2014–15, 2015–16, 2017–18, 2018–19, 2020–21, 2021–22, 2022–23
Rock Cup: 19
 1985–86, 1988–89, 1989–90, 1992–93, 1993–94, 2001–02, 2003–04, 2004–05, 2005–06, 2006–07, 2007–08, 2008–09, 2009–10, 2010–11, 2013–14, 2014–15, 2015–16, 2020–21, 2021–22
Pepe Reyes Cup: 11
 2001, 2002, 2004, 2007, 2008, 2009, 2010, 2011, 2014, 2015, 2017

Regional
Gibraltar League Senior Cup: 18
 1986–87, 1987–88, 1988–89, 1989–90, 1990–91, 1991–92, 1992–93, 1999–00, 2001–02, 2002–03, 2003–04, 2004–05, 2005–06, 2006–07, 2007–08, 2010–11, 2011–12, 2013–14

European record

Lincoln's first qualifying round match of the 2014–15 UEFA Champions League marked the first match played by a Gibraltarian club in UEFA competition. After converting a penalty, a second half goal was conceded and the game ended in a draw.

Overall

Matches

Notes
 PR: Preliminary round
 1Q: First qualifying round
 2Q: Second qualifying round
 PO: Play-off round
 GS: Group stage

Current squad

First team

Intermediate League squad
Players registered for the Gibraltar Intermediate League without senior squad numbers. First team players may also appear for this team

On loan

Club staff
''Correct as of 25 October 2022.

See also

 List of unbeaten football club seasons

References

External links
Official website
Lincoln Red Imps F.C. Twitter account
UEFA profile

 
Football clubs in Gibraltar
Gibraltar National League clubs
Association football clubs established in 1976
1976 establishments in Gibraltar